Thomas Pellow (1704 – 45), son of Thomas Pellow of Penryn and his wife Elizabeth (née Lyttleton), was a Cornish author best known for the extensive captivity narrative entitled The History of the Long Captivity and Adventures of Thomas Pellow in South-Barbary. Pellow's book chronicles his many adventures spent during his 23-year-long captivity (summer 1715 – July 1738) giving a detailed account of his capture by Barbary pirates, his experiences as a slave under Sultan Moulay Ismail, and his final escape from Morocco back to his Cornish origins.

His captivity began at the age of eleven when sailing abroad in the summer of 1716 when his ship was attacked by Barbary pirates after crossing the Bay of Biscay traveling with his uncle, John Pellow, who was the ship's captain alongside five other Englishmen. Pellow and his shipmates were taken captive and delivered to Sultan Moulay Ismail of Morocco as prisoners. Pellow was one of the individuals hand picked by the sultan along with three others and integrated into one of Ismail's many slaves.

Life as a Slave

Thomas Pellow, after being pulled aside by the Sultan, was led into the armoury where he and others were tasked with cleaning the arms and cases belonging to the Sultan and his army, though he did not stay doing that for long as he was soon given by the emperor to his son, Muley Spha.

Muley Spha was known to be an unsavoury individual and for giving his slaves futile tasks to perform, such as running morning to night after his (Muley Spha's) horse's heels. Then when Muley Spha noticed how bright Pellow was, instead of beating him as was his custom, he tried to convince him to convert to Islam, promising him gifts and a better life as one of his esteemed friends. After all the bribes and temptations had been rejected, Muley Spha became infuriated and began to torture Pellow. "[He] committed me prisoner to one of his own rooms, keeping me there several months in irons, and every day most severely bastinading me." Eventually, after weeks and weeks of horrendous torture, Pellow gave in and was forced to convert. After a time, Moulay Ismail ordered his son to bring Pellow so that he could go to school and learn the Moorish language. When Muley Spha disobeyed this order, he was summoned by the sultan and killed right before Pellow.

With time, Moulay Ismail assigned Pellow into the 'Abid al-Bukhari'. According to Pellow’s text, white European converts could rise within the Moroccan military system, but were confined to their own separate fighting units. These units were generally much less important to Ismail’s government and military operations than their counterparts in the ‘Abid.

Marriage and Pellow 

Throughout his narrative, Pellow only mentions his marriage a few times. Most of the writing we can see on his marriage comes from his detailing of the collective wedding where he received his wife as a reward from Moulay Ismail. He also mentions his wife's family and the status of his new brother-in-law shortly after he describes his wedding, but he references his wife and children only a few other times in the latter portions of his narrative.

Ismail may have been marrying his slaves to reward them for their service, but he also would have benefitted from the enslaved children that would have resulted from enslaved marriages. Pellow never states that his wife was a slave, so we do not know if his children were born slaves. These marriages would have also made the prospect of escape more difficult for slaves who grew fond of their spouses, as these slaves would either need to abandon their spouses or risk increasing their visibility by escaping with at least one other person.

Pellow never had to consider if he wanted to bring his wife and daughter with him when he successfully escaped, as they had both died while he was campaigning as a slave-soldier. In response to the news that his family was dead, he wrote “I thought them to be by far better off than they could have been in this troublesome World, especially this Part of it ; and I was really very glad that they were delivered out of it, and therefore it gave me very little uneasiness."

Pellow as an elite slave 
Thomas Pellow's extensive slave narrative The History of the Long Captivity and Adventures of Thomas Pellow chronicles the captivity of a twelve-year-old Christian cabin boy and his development into an elite military slave during the reign of Moroccan Sultan Mulay Ismail. From the age 12, Pellow was plucked from preadolescence and placed on a rigorous track leading to his eventual military role as a preeminent captain in the Moroccan Army. Elite slaves like Thomas Pellow played a vital role in the armed forces, often serving as soldiers and as officers, leading to the acquisition of important roles in administration, politics, and all aspects of public affairs.

As part of this world, Pellow was only one of many European males who were taken and placed into military slavery. Pellow was part of a "band of European slaves mixed among other races that formed an elite army corps." As one of these elite members, Pellow fought on the frontlines with ferocious proficiency, and his role in combat was primarily as  an "infantryman."  Being that these slave soldiers were infantrymen, the monarchs viewed their role in their armies as “an integral, perhaps a primary, part of the conquering Ottoman army." However, despite their value, these soldiers were regulated as servile classes and "were not allowed to carry a sword, nor to carry an iron spear, these being distinctions of a free man, but slaves did carry some sort of weapon." 

Very soon after Pellow's Barbary capture and conversion to Islam, he goes on a forward track towards his elite slave stature. Pellow was educated to speak Arabic, as well as how to perform Moroccan social customs. From roughly the age of 12, Thomas Pellow was given the responsibility of managing 80 slave boys. Pellow excelled in his new position and eventually was transferred into the palace to work as a personal attendant for Moulay Ismail's son, Mulai Zidan. Pellow's close proximity to the monarch's family exposed him to the many forms of capricious violence the Mulai family often employed. During his time there he witnessed the murder of Zidan, his favourite black slave, for disturbing two pigeons that Zidan was observing. His role as Zidan's personal attendant was a preparatory grooming technique that tested Pellow's ability to care for the monarch.

Having a primary account of the wrath of Moulay Ismail no doubt prepared Pellow for witnessing the many capricious killings performed by the sultan. In the narrative, Pellow expresses the daily anxieties he was forced to live amongst as compared to how law is enforced in England.

Pellow was considered a valuable slave. He was conditioned to live in constant fear of his life being ended at a moment's notice. This mental conditioning clearly compromised all relationships Pellow had with the Mulai family. Renowned slavery scholar Orlando Patterson describes Pellow's anxieties about master relations as follows: "No authentic human relationship was possible where violence was the ultimate sanction. There could be no trust, no genuine sympathy; and while a kind of love may sometimes have triumphed over this perverse form of interaction, intimacy was usually calculation, and sadomasochistic".

As Pellow became an adult, Ismail promoted him to a high-status military position. Pellow was made an officer in the sultan's army and participated in three military campaigns. He led other slave-soldiers into battle and once took part in a slave-gathering expedition in sub-Saharan Africa. Pellow eventually fled Morocco by boarding an Irish ship and returned home in the summer of 1738.

Slave army 
After being the personal slave for the Sultan's son, Pellow eventually joined the Sultan's army—an army that consisted almost entirely of slave-soldiers who had been captured as young children and indoctrinated.  Pellow was made an officer in the slave army. Unlike all other military slaves, who spend their lives training for war, Pellow joined the sultan's army later in life. He led other slave-soldiers into battle and once took part in a slave-gathering expedition in sub-Saharan Africa.

There was a stark difference between the independent renegades encountered in the narrative and their slave counterparts, “As the mercenaries or allies, they retained their own loyalties, but as slaves, they could be subjected to reorientation. Prior to enrollment in the army, they were prepared for service; the government secured their loyalty and fitted their military skills to the needs of the army.” Unlike the free-thinking allies and mercenaries for hire, a slave’s life depended on their masters. They were trained to fight and forced into combat against their will. As such, the process of making them submissive to their masters was a long and arduous one by which they were beaten into shape and into a fearful loyalty to their masters. The alien soldiers were isolated figures whose isolation and alienation caused them to adopt what they were left with as normality. "He took them from their homeland to a strange country and cut them off from the rest of the society. They had no choice but to accept the affiliations provided them and to become loyal to him. They developed close relations with their comrades, all of whom shared a similar predicament." These slaves were held on a tight leash and their indoctrination, while isolating, helped them to form what bonds that they could amongst themselves.

As well as being kept in poor living conditions, they were also beaten. The emperor would say that he would do these cruel acts to the slaves to see if they were hard enough, if they were prepared to fight in his army. "Sometimes you would see forty or fifty of them all sprawling in their blood, none of them daring to rise till he left the place, where they were lying, and if they were discountenanced and out of heart at this usage, they were of a bastard-breed, and must turn out of his service" . Even after this type of treatment the soldiers were completely loyal to their emperor. The emperor would give them such incentives as distributing money among them to make them eager to march on expeditions they were ordered upon. To understand this reasoning for going outside of your country to form an army, one must appreciate that it was easy for the sultan to quickly gather armies among large populations and forcibly have their undying loyalty.

Allen R. Meyers has written a paper that "describes the development of a slave army, the 'Abid al Bukhari, which enabled one such sultan, Ismail ibn al-Sharif, to establish a large and relatively durable Moroccan state". Ismail created the slave army in an effort to "consolidate his power, to expand the kingdom, to suppress internal dissent, and to repulse the European and Ottoman threat". Meyers states that with the army's support, Ismail was able to collect taxes, suppress rebellion, and maintain public order. Ismail first created his army by confiscating three thousand male slaves from the residents of Marrakech, which he would later increase to around fifty thousand slaves, many of whom were part of a group of people called Haratins. Creating this self-sufficient army could also have its drawbacks, with uprisings and rebellions, such as a poor relationship with Islamic scholars due to his enslaving of fellow Muslims, an act that was considered to be blasphemous.

On Pellow's return to Europe after his escape, he was met with misunderstanding and confusion, contrary to what some scholars seem to think. Pellow was no longer the English man that he remembered, and he was viewed suspiciously even before he arrived back on English soil. When his boat was travelling to port, he recalled, "I was denied by the Sentinels, telling me that till they had Orders for my so doing, they would not suffer any Moor to land: Moor! said I, you are very much mistaken in that, for I am as good a Christian (though I am dressed in the Moorish Garb) as any of you all". Like other captives, Pellow found it hard to re-adjust on coming home. His overall appearance would have been so shocking that even his parents did not recognise him when he arrived. Still it is thought by some scholars that, "Under the circumstances, enslaved people in the Islamic lands had far greater opportunities for integration into mainstream society". This being an obvious misunderstanding by the clear evidence that Pellow, a devout Christian and Englishman himself, had difficulties in proving his loyalty to his home country upon returning.

Pellow's Return Home 

After his years as a slave had finally come to an end, Pellow was faced with the daunting task of finding his way home to Penryn, Cornwall, Britain. He managed to secure himself passage aboard a ship bound for Gibraltar but once the ship had docked, Pellow was forbidden to go ashore. Pellow's attire, tanned skin, and thick beard (which was considered a symbol of masculinity in Islamic culture), caused the harbor guards to mistake Pellow for a Moor and initially refuse to let him disembark "till they had Orders for my so doing." Pellow called out to them to convince them he was as much a Christian man as them. The guards did not believe Pellow until his identity was at last verified. Once the confusion was cleared up, Pellow was able to leave the ship. While Pellow was still in Gibraltar he found himself being paranoid of being taken back to Morocco.  A man named Mr. Abramico had been threatening to take Pellow back to Barbary.  Pellow then physically assaulted Mr. Abramico in the street before some of his friends convinced him to stop the attack. A few days later he found himself a ship bound for London and managed to secure himself a ride.  After his brief stint in London, Pellow made multiple trips to eventually find his way back to Penryn.

Pellow found himself tormented by his twenty years of fighting, and upon his return he found great difficulty in acclimating back into English society. "Thomas Pellow had not just been captured by Barbary: he had in the process been changed. Irreversibly so, as it turned out, for he was never able to make a satisfactory life for himself on return to Britain." Pellow's difficulty with reintegration is severely administered by his life in Barbary. Not only was he far from home, but he was indoctrinated into the Arab world and accepted his reality and their religion. Pellow's irreversible change was what made him an outsider, and made finding meaning in a place that was once his home impossible. "Pellow's inability to settle back in and make good, may have been due to more, however, than his own alienation. In his absence, not only he but his country had been transformed." Pellow was a man with only one particular set of skills, and found himself was completely lost in a place that was once his home. The world at home was not the place he had once become accustomed to; instead, it was a place that he felt distant from and unable to relate to the people at home. Even when he spotted his cousin during his escape, he chose to avoid him because he felt so distant due to his many years away from his people and his blood. "I looked sharp out for a vessel, but could not find anyone to my Mind; not but here were two, and one belonging to Joshua Bawden,…my first Cousin, we being Sisters Children; however, tho' I met him twice, and my Blood boiled in my Veins at the Sight of him, yet we did not speak on either Side, which was no doubt a very great Misfortune to me; for had he known who I was, he would, I am well satisfied, have carry'd me with him."

Pellow's disorientation and feeling of apprehension carried over into his arrival at his hometown of Penryn. Even though he was happy to be back in his homeland, Pellow admitted that everything was foreign to him. He did not recognize anyone. Not even his parents, who, in turn, only recognized him because they had heard of his impending return, were recognizable. (Pellow originally had a sister, though his narrative does not speak of her during the retelling of his homecoming. It is speculated that she may have died of fever years before. If Pellow had any other siblings born after his capture, the narrative does not say.) Pellow was treated as a returning hero of sorts, even given a celebration, but unfortunately the roles of his home countries had reversed. His native home had become a strange place to him and the land of his captivity had become more like home.

References

Further reading
Ali, Kecia. Marriage and Slavery in Early Islam. Cambridge, MA: Harvard UP, 2010.
Ali, Kecia. Sexual Ethics and Islam: Feminist Reflections on Qur'an, Hadith, and Jurisprudence. Oxford, England: Oneworld Pub., 2006.
Amin, S. "Trans-Saharan Exchange and the Black Slave Trade." Diogenes 45.179 (1997): 31–47.
Austen, Ralph A. Trans-Saharan Africa in World History. New York, NY: Oxford UP, 2010.
Bekkaoui, Khalid. White Women Captives in North Africa Narratives of Enslavement, 1735–1830. Basingstoke: Palgrave Macmillan, 2011.
Bennett, Norman Robert. “Christian and Negro Slavery in Eighteenth-Century North Africa .” The Journal of African History , vol. 1, no. 1, 1960, pp. 65–82.
Blunt, Wilfrid. Black Sunrise; the Life and times of Mulai Ismail, Emperor of Morocco, 1646–1727. London: Methuen, 1951.
Celinscak, Mark. "Captivity and Encounter: Thomas Pellow, The Moroccan Renegade." University of Toronto Art Journal 1 (2008): 1–10.
Clissold, Stephen The Barbary Slaves New Jersey: Rowman and Littlefield, 1977, 86.
Colley, Linda. Captives (New York: Pantheon Books, 2002), 44.
Davis, Robert C. Christian Slaves, Muslim Masters: White Slavery in the Mediterranean, the Barbary Coast, and Italy, 1500–1800. Houndmills, Basingstoke,Hampshire: Palgrave Macmillan, 2003.
El Hamel, Chouki. "The Register Of The Slaves Of Sultan Mawlay Isma'Il Of Morocco At The Turn Of The Eighteenth Century." The Journal of African History 51.01 (2010): 89–98.
Hamel, Chouki El. Black Morocco: a History of Slavery, Race, and Islam. Cambridge University Press., 2013.
 Hughey, Matthew W. “Cinethetic Racism: White Redemption and Black Stereotypes in ‘Magical Negro’ Films .” Social Problems, vol. 56, no. 3, 2009, pp. 543–577. August
Glenn, Cerise L. “The Power of Black Magic: The Magical Negro and White Salvation in Film.” Journal of Black Studies, vol. 40, no. 2, Nov. 2009, pp. 135–152.
Matar, Nabil, Turks, Moors, and Englishmen in the Age of Discovery (New York) Columbia University Press, 1993, 72.
Meyers, Allen R. "Slave Soldiers and State Politics in Early 'Alawi Morocco, 1668–1727." The International Journal of African Historical Studies 16.1 (1983): 39–48. JSTOR. Web. 2 April 2013.
Murray Gordon. Slavery in the Arab World. New York: New Amsterdam, 1989.
Milton, Giles. White Gold: The Extraordinary Story of Thomas Pellow and Islam's One Million White Slaves. New York: Farrar, Straus and Giroux, 2004.
Patterson, Orlando. "Introduction: The Constituent Elements of Slavery & Part 1: The Internal Relations of Slavery." Slavery and Social Death: A Comparative Study. Cambridge, MA: Harvard UP, 1982. 2–299.
Pellow, Thomas. The History of the Long Captivity and Adventures of Thomas Pellow in South-Barbary Giving an Account of His Being Taken by Two Sallee Rovers and Carry'd a Slave ... for the Space of Twenty-three Years ... London: Printed for R. Goadby and Sold by W. Owen, n.d. [1751].
Prange, Sebastian. "Trust in God, but Tie Your Camel First.' The Economic Organization of the Trans-Saharan Slave Trade between the Fourteenth and Nineteenth Centuries." Journal of Global History 1.02 (2006): 1–64.
Ralph Austen, and Dennis Cordell. "Trade, Transportation, And Expanding Economic Networks: Saharan Caravan Commerce In the era Of European Expansion, 1500–1900." Black Business and Economic Power. Rochester, NY: University of Rochester, 2002. 86–120.
Seng, Yvonne. "A Liminal State: Slavery in Sixteenth-Century Istanbul." Slavery in the Islamic Middle East. Ed. Shaun E. Marmon. Princeton, NJ: M. Wiener, 1999. 25–42.
Toledano, Ehud R. As If Silent and Absent: Bonds of Enslavement in the Islamic Middle East. Yale University Press, 2007.
Webb, James L. A. "The Horse and Slave Trade Between the Western Sahara and Senegambia."The Journal of African History 34.02 (1993): 221–246.
Wright, John. The Trans-Saharan Slave Trade. London: Routledge, 2007.
Zilfi, Madeline C. Women and Slavery in the Late Ottoman Empire: The Design of Difference. New York: Cambridge UP, 2010.
Zilfi, Women and Slavery in the Late Ottoman Empire: The Design of Difference. Ali, Marriage and Slavery in Early Islam. Ali, Sexual Ethics and Islam: Feminist Reflections on Qur'an, Hadith, and Jurisprudence.

External links
  Thomas Pellow and Robert Brown (1890) The Adventures of Thomas Pellow, of Penryn, Mariner: Three and Twenty Years in Captivity among the Moors (Google eBook)

People who wrote slave narratives
18th-century British writers
1704 births
Year of death missing
Moroccan slaves
18th-century memoirists
18th-century slaves